Fort Hill Estate is a historic estate located at Lloyd Harbor in Suffolk County, New York. The estate home is a monumental brick and limestone Tudor Revival style structure built as a summer home in 1879, and enlarged in 1900. It is a three-story mansion with an irregular, asymmetrical and sprawling plan which is roughly "C" shaped. It features a conical tower built as part of the original structure, designed by McKim, Mead, and White. Also on the estate are a formal garden, a water tower, a superintendent's house, two garages, and a cottage.

It was added to the National Register of Historic Places in 1988.

References

Houses on the National Register of Historic Places in New York (state)
Houses completed in 1879
Houses in Suffolk County, New York
National Register of Historic Places in Suffolk County, New York